Druzhnaya Station is any one of four different Antarctic research stations operated by the Soviet Union and later Russia from 1976 to 2013.

Druzhnaya I 
Druzhnaya I was established in 1975 as seasonal field camps on the Filchner Ice Shelf to carry out topographic and geodetic mapping of the local area.

In 1986, satellite images revealed ice breakup near Druzhnaya I. It drifted to sea in 1986 when the ice it was on broke from the main ice shelf. It was later discovered at sea by the ship Kapitan Kondratyev. Its equipment and prefabricated structures were airlifted to the recently constructed Druzhnaya III.

Druzhnaya II 
Druzhnaya II was a temporary field camp that operated from January 13 to February 21, 1982, on the Ronne Ice Shelf. It supported in the carrying out of radar sounding of the ice shelf.

Druzhnaya III 
Druzhnaya III was established in 1987 near Cape Norvegia. The station was constructed in two weeks. Kapitan Kondratyev offloaded materials for the station immediately before proceeding to its Druzhnaya I salvage mission. It was closed in 1991.

Druzhnaya IV 
Druzhnaya IV was established in 1987 near Sandefjord Bay (Coronation Island). Its main purposes were the logistic support to Soyuz Station and assistance with the creation of the Progress Station. It operated every summer season from until 1991. It was last used in the austral summer of 2013, after which it was prepared for long-term hibernation.

See also 

 List of Antarctic research stations
 List of Antarctic field camps

References 

1975 establishments in Antarctica